Chris Balch is a New Hampshire politician.

Career
On November 6, 2018, Balch was elected to the New Hampshire House of Representatives where he represents the Hillsborough 38 district. Balch assumed office on December 5, 2018. Balch is a Democrat. Balch endorsed Bernie Sanders in the 2020 Democratic Party presidential primaries.

Personal life
Balch resides in Wilton, New Hampshire. Balch is married and has three children.

In May 2022, Balch was charged with criminal mischief and timber trespass by the New Hampshire Division of Forests and Lands for spiking trees in state-owned forests in an effort to prevent logging.

References

Living people
People from Wilton, New Hampshire
Democratic Party members of the New Hampshire House of Representatives
21st-century American politicians
New Hampshire politicians convicted of crimes
Year of birth missing (living people)